Four Sisters and a Wedding is a 2013 Filipino Family comedy-drama film directed by Cathy Garcia-Molina. The film features Star Cinema's most prominent young actresses: Toni Gonzaga, Bea Alonzo, Angel Locsin and Shaina Magdayao, as the four sisters attempting to stop the wedding of their younger brother played by Enchong Dee. Actress Angelica Panganiban was originally part of the main cast but was pulled out and was replaced by Shaina Magdayao.

The film is part of Star Cinema's 20th anniversary presentation in collaboration with Rebisco on its 50th anniversary. Four Sisters and a Wedding was released in the Philippines on June 26, 2013, and internationally on July 5, 2013.

Plot
 
When CJ (Enchong Dee), the youngest of the family, announced that he is getting married, his sister, Gabbie, convinces the other sisters to come back home for the wedding as requested by their mother Grace (Coney Reyes). Teddie (Toni Gonzaga), the eldest, is a laid off teacher secretly working as a waitress and housekeeper in Madrid; the second sister Bobbie (Bea Alonzo), works as a corporate communications manager in New York and is living with her boyfriend Tristan (Sam Milby) and his daughter Trixie (Samantha Faytaren); the third sister Alex (Angel Locsin) is living independently and works as an assistant film director; while Gabbie (Shaina Magdayao) is a school teacher and takes care of their mother.

Bobbie, having a difficult relationship with Trixie, is pressured by the eagerness of Tristan to get married. Alex, on the other hand, is having a hard time with her filmmaking gig as well as her relationship with Bobbie's ex, Chad (Bernard Palanca). Meanwhile, Teddie has not earned enough to buy a plane ticket, so she asked help from her housekeeping colleague, Frodo (Janus del Prado), and convinced him to go back to Manila together and pretend that they are a couple.

When the family reunites, the sisters expressed their opinion on CJ's abrupt decision of getting married, offending him. CJ accepted their apology, but told them to behave themselves when they meet his fiancée, Princess (Angeline Quinto), and her family, The Bayags.

At the Bayags' villa, the sisters are taken aback when Princess's parents, Jeanette (Carmi Martin ) and Honey Boy (Boboy Garovillo) asks him to sign a prenuptial agreement. Appalled, the sisters decided to formulate a plan to stop the wedding from happening. When Bobbie suggests that CJ is only marrying Princess because she was "the best candidate in a diminishing pool of options", Teddie asks their housekeeper, Toti Marie (Cecil Paz), to introduce CJ to a lot of girls. Toti Marie came up with a boys’ night out with hookers, however the plan failed. The following day, as Tristan is about to leave overseas for business, he tells Bobbie that by the time he gets back, she should now be willing to marry him.

Meanwhile, Teddie and Frodo went on to one of the Bayags’ family businesses - a spa that has an obscene tag line and offers a "happy ending" to their customers. Thinking that they would be able to find anomalies, Teddie asks Frodo to avail one of the services. As Frodo was moaning in one of the massage areas, Teddie immediately called the police to have the area inspected. They found out that the "happy ending" was in fact, thinking of happy thoughts after a massage. Jeanette arrives at the scene and threatens to have the Salazars investigated.

CJ confronts his sisters about the spa incident and assured them that the wedding will take place no matter what. Bobbie confronts Teddie for continuing her plan but it led to a huge argument. Later that evening, Bobbie saw Chad flirting with another woman while buying condoms at a convenience store. The following morning, Bobbie talks to Alex about what she saw, but they ended up having a huge fight.

The Bayags came over to the Salazar's residence to show the gowns for the wedding. The Salazars did not like them, so Honey Boy (Boboy Garovillo) decided that they play charades - wherein the family who wins gets to decide what gowns to wear.

During the game, the Bayags kept on hinting that Teddie is a maid. Grace immediately disrupts them and had the Bayags leave for insulting her daughter inside their own home. Grace confronts Teddie about the Bayag's behaviour, and she admits that when Spain was in crisis, she was one of the teachers that was laid off, and she lets go of all of her emotional turmoil. During the confrontation, Bobbie gently and emotionally tells Grace how hurt she was her whole life, for not being anyone's favorite, and how jealous she was of her siblings for all of their different traits. She explained how hard and lonely her life was in New York. Upon hearing her struggles, Trixie now understands Bobbie's situation and drops her spoiled brat attitude towards her.

The following day, Alex and Bobbie reconciles, and Alex confronts Chad and finally ends things with him. Later that day, CJ calls his family, informing them that Princess's grandfather died. The two families reconciled and gave their apologies.

Due to a superstition that prohibits weddings after the death in the family within a year, CJ and Princess's wedding did not push through. In order for the preparations and expenses not to go to waste, Bobbie used it as a chance to fulfill Tristan's dream of marrying her.

Cast

Main Cast
Bea Alonzo as Roberta Olivia "Bobbie" Salazar
Angel Locsin as Alexandra Camille "Alex" Salazar
Toni Gonzaga as Teodora Grace "Teddie" Salazar
Shaina Magdayao as Gabriella Sophia "Gabbie" Salazar
Enchong Dee as CJ "Reb-reb" Salazar
Coney Reyes as Grace Salazar

Supporting Cast
Sam Milby as Tristan Harris
Angeline Quinto as Princess Antoinette May Bayag
Carmi Martin as Jeanette Bayag
Boboy Garovillo as Honey Boy Bayag
Janus del Prado as Godofredo Teodoro
Bernard Palanca as Chad
Vangie Labalan  as Manang Bugayong
Cecil Paz as Toti Marie
Joy Viado as Sassa
Samantha Faytaren as Trixie Harris
Juan Rodrigo as Carlos Salazar (voice and photo appearances only) (Uncredited)
Mocha Uson as herself

Soundtrack
The film's soundtrack was Salamat, which was written by Christian Martinez, and performed by Richard Yap. The said song was also used in the celebration of Rebisco's (the film's sponsor) 50th anniversary.

Accolades

Prequel

On February 27, 2020, Star Cinema announced that the film will be getting a prequel entitled "Four Sisters Before the Wedding". The prequel will also be directed by Giselle Andres, an assistant director in the original film, however, Mae Cruz-Alviar replaced her instead, and it
will be set during the Salazar siblings' teenage years. The prequel will star Charlie Dizon, Alexa Ilacad, Gillian Vicencio, and Belle Mariano as Teddie, Bobbie, Alex, and Gabbie, respectively. It will be produced by SCX, a new sub brand under ABS-CBN Films, Star Cinema.

References

External links
 

2013 films
Films directed by Cathy Garcia-Molina
Films about Filipino women
2010s Tagalog-language films
Star Cinema films
2010s English-language films